The Belvidere School District is a comprehensive community public school district that serves students in pre-kindergarten through twelfth grade from Belvidere in Warren County, New Jersey, United States.

As of the 2020–21 school year, the district, comprised of two schools, had an enrollment of 631 students and 61.5 classroom teachers (on an FTE basis), for a student–teacher ratio of 10.3:1. Starting in the 2019-20 school year, Third Street School was closed and all PreK-8 programs are part of Oxford Street School.

Students from Harmony Township, Hope Township and White Township attend the district's high school as part of sending/receiving relationships with the respective districts.

The district participates in the Interdistrict Public School Choice Program, having been approved on July 14, 2000, to participate in the program. Seats in the program for non-resident students are specified by the district and are allocated by lottery, with tuition paid for participating students by the New Jersey Department of Education.

The district is classified by the New Jersey Department of Education as being in District Factor Group "DE", the fifth-highest of eight groupings. District Factor Groups organize districts statewide to allow comparison by common socioeconomic characteristics of the local districts. From lowest socioeconomic status to highest, the categories are A, B, CD, DE, FG, GH, I and J.

History
As part of a cost-saving measure, Third Street School was closed after the 2018–19 school year and merged into Oxford Street Elementary School.

Schools
Schools in the district (with 2020–21 enrollment data from the National Center for Education Statistics) are:
Elementary school
Oxford Street Elementary School with 262 students in grades PreK-8
Christopher Karabinus, Principal
High school
Belvidere High School with 367 students in grades 9-12
Dr. Jessica McKinney, Principal

Administration
Senior members of the district's administration are:
Christopher Carrubba, Superintendent
Rachelle Tjalma, Business Administrator / Board Secretary

Board of education
The district's board of education is comprised of nine members who set policy and oversee the fiscal and educational operation of the district through its administration. As a Type II school district, the board's trustees are elected directly by voters to serve three-year terms of office on a staggered basis, with three seats up for election each year held (since 2012) as part of the November general election. The board appoints a superintendent to oversee the district's day-to-day operations and a business administrator to supervise the business functions of the district. The board includes an additional member from each of the three sending districts.

References

External links
Belvidere School District
 
Data for the Belvidere School District, National Center for Education Statistics

Belvidere, New Jersey
New Jersey District Factor Group DE
School districts in Warren County, New Jersey